Pavel Eisner (16 January 1889 – 8 July 1958), also known as Paul Eisner and under the pseudonym Vincy Schwarze, was Czech-German linguist and translator and the author of many studies about Czech language. He is considered one of the most important Czech translators of all time and was said to be proficient in 12 languages - English, French, Icelandic, Italian, Hungarian, German, Norwegian, Persian, Russian, Serbian, Spanish, and Tibetan. He produced some of the earliest Czech language translations of Franz Kafka's work.

Biography
Eisner came from a Jewish family in Prague. He was bilingual from his childhood. He went to college at Prague's German University, where he studied Slavonic, German, and Romance languages and graduated in 1918. He worked as a translator for the Czech Chamber of Commerce and Crafts and, at the same time, edited for the German newspaper, Prager Presse. During this time, he also contributed to several cultural magazines. During the German occupation he was persecuted as a Jew, but survived because he was married to a non-Jewish German woman. He managed to publish a book under his pseudonym Vincy Schwarze.

Works
Franz Kafka and Prague (1950)

External links 
 Pavel Eisner in The Dictionary of Czech Literature after 1945 in Czech
 Pavel Eisner at the page of Czech Literary Translators' Guild in Czech

1889 births
1958 deaths
Writers from Prague
People from the Kingdom of Bohemia
Czech Jews
Converts to Protestantism from Judaism
Czech Protestants
Czech translators
Czech poets
Czech male poets
Linguists from the Czech Republic
20th-century Czech poets
20th-century translators
20th-century male writers
20th-century linguists